The Xina Solar One Power Station is a  concentrated solar power plant in South Africa. Constructed between 2014 and 2016, the power station was commercially commissioned in  2017. The solar component of this power station is complemented by molten salt thermal storage technology, which allows the power station to provide full power for another 5.5 hours, after the sun goes down, thus supplying energy during South African peak hours. The consortium that owns the solar farm comprises a foreign independent power producer (IPP), two domestic finance development companies and a local charity. The energy generated here is sold directly to Eskom, the South African national electricity utility company, under a 20-year power purchase agreement (PPA).

Location
The power station is located near Pofadder, a small town in Khâi-Ma Municipality, in Namakwa District, in the Northern Cape Province of South Africa, close to the international border with Namibia. The geographical coordinates of Xina Solar One Power Station are:28°53'21.0"S, 19°35'23.0"E (Latitude:-28.889167; Longitude:19.589722).

Overview
The power station has a 100 megawatt solar power capacity. Using parabolic mirrors, the station concentrates sunlight to produce heat. That heat is used to melt salts to store energy. When the sun sets, the solar component is extinguished. The molten salts are then processed through a heat exchanger to release heat and generate electricity, after sunset. Even when the sun is up, the solar energy is converted into heat by the parabolic mirrors. That heat is then used to heat water to produce steam. It is the steam that drives the electricity generators, when the sun is up or down.

The water used to run this power station is sourced from the Orange River. In order to produce 1 MWh of electricity, the power station uses  of water.

Developers
The owners of the power station established a special purpose vehicle company (SPV) called XiNa Solar One Pty Limited to own, design, finance, develop, operate and maintain this power station. The ownership in the SPV at the time of commissioning is as illustrated in the table below.

In 2021 Abengoa Solar concluded the sale of its 40 percent shareholding in the Xina Solar One Power Station and concurrent 46 percent ownership in the Xina Operations & Maintenance Company (Pty) Limited. The buyer was Engie, the French multinational utility company.

Construction costs and commissioning

The power station cost US$880 million to construct. Ground breaking occurred in 2014 and commercial commissioning took place in 2017.

See also

 Solar power in South Africa
 List of power stations in South Africa
 Karoshoek Solar Power Station

References

External links
 Abengoa completes sale of Xina Solar One Concentrated Solar Power to Engie As of 18 November 2021.

Solar power stations in South Africa
Economy of the Northern Cape
2017 establishments in South Africa
Energy infrastructure completed in 2017
Solar thermal energy
21st-century architecture in South Africa